Minchinellidae is a family of calcareous sponges in the order Calcarea. It is the only family in the monotypic class Lithonida.

Description 

Calcaronea with reinforced skeleton
consisting either of linked or cemented basal actines of
tetractines, or of a rigid basal mass of calcite. Diapason
spicules are generally present and the canal system is
leuconoid.

References

External links 
 http://www.catalogueoflife.org/col/browse/tree

Calcaronea
Taxa named by Arthur Dendy